The Secretary for Economic Coordination was the bureau secretary and finance minister in Portuguese Macau. The Secretary headed the Secretariat for Economic Coordination, which was responsible for financial affairs in the colony. The department was replaced by the Secretariat for Economy and Finance.

Organisational structure 
 Macau Economic Service
 Finance Services Bureau
 Statistics and Census Bureau
 Labour Affairs Bureau
 Social Security Fund
 Gaming Inspection and Coordination Bureau
 Pension Fund
 Consumer Council
 Macau Trade and Investment Promotion Institute
 Macau Monetary Authority
 Human Resources Office

List of Secretariats
 Vítor Rodrigues Pessoa

References
 Casa de Macau - references to former Portuguese secretaries

Members of the Executive Council of Macau
Government departments and agencies of Macau
 Macau
Political office-holders in Macau
Positions of the Macau Government
1999 disestablishments in Macau